Moureaux Point is a point which forms the north extremity of Kran Peninsula and Liege Island in Palmer Archipelago, Antarctica. The feature was charted by the French Antarctic Expedition under Charcot, 1903–05, who named it for Théodule Moureaux, director of the Parc Saint-Maur Observatory, near Paris.  The point was photographed from the air by FIDASE, 1956-57.

Further reading 
 NATIONAL GEOSPATIAL-INTELLIGENCE AGENCY, Sailing Directions (planning Guide) and (enroute) for Antarctica, P 145

See also
Mount Pierre (Palmer Archipelago)

References

External links 

 Moureaux Point on USGS website
 Moureaux Point on AADC website
 Moureaux Point on SCAR website
 Moureaux Point Copernix satellite image

Headlands of the Palmer Archipelago
Liège Island